Ranunculus glaberrimus, the sagebrush buttercup, is a species of flowering plant in the buttercup family, Ranunculaceae. It is native to interior western North America, in western Canada, the western United States, and the northwestern Great Plains.

Distribution
Ranunculus glaberrimus is found from central British Columbia east to southern Saskatchewan, south through the Dakotas to Kansas, through the Rocky Mountains southeast to northern New Mexico, west to the Great Basin region, and southwest to northeastern California.

It occurs in habitat types with junipers (Juniperus occidentalis), sagebrush (Artemisia tridentata) and bitterbrush (Purshia tridentata), in damp ground. It flowers relatively early.

Description
The roots are clustered and fleshy. The somewhat thick basal leaves are oval, with long petioles, ranging from entire to having three deep lobes. Cauline leaves have short petioles but are otherwise similar. The flowers have four to ten yellow petals (usually five) about 1 cm long. The sepals are yellow-purple, and the stamens and pistils are numerous.

The species is reportedly toxic to livestock and possibly to humans as well.

Gallery

See also
Sagebrush steppe
Great Basin shrub steppe

References

External links
Ranunculus glaberrimus var. ellipticus. Burke Museum, University of Washington.
Ranunculus glaberrimus. The Jepson eFlora 2013.
Ranunculus glaberrimus. CalPhotos.

glaberrimus
Flora of the Western United States
Flora of Western Canada
Flora of the Great Basin
Flora of the Great Plains (North America)